Lokot is the name of several inhabited localities in Russia.

Urban localities
Lokot, Bryansk Oblast, a work settlement in Brasovsky District of Bryansk Oblast

Rural localities
Lokot, Loktevsky District, Altai Krai, a selo in Loktevsky Selsoviet of Loktevsky District of Altai Krai